Vincent Albert Taylor (December 6, 1845 – December 2, 1922) was a soldier, businessman, and single-term U.S. Representative from Ohio from 1891 to 1893.

Biography
Born in Bedford, Ohio, Taylor attended the common schools.

Civil War
During the American Civil War, he enlisted in May 1864 in Company H, One Hundred and Fiftieth Regiment, Ohio Volunteer Infantry, a Hundred Days Regiment. In August of the same year, he enrolled in Company H, One Hundred and Seventy-seventh Regiment, Ohio Volunteer Infantry and served until the close of the war.

After mustering out of the service, he returned to Bedford and engaged in manufacturing pursuits. He served as member of the Ohio Senate 1888-1890.

Congress 
Taylor was elected as a Republican to the Fifty-second Congress (March 4, 1891 – March 3, 1893). He was not a candidate for renomination in 1892.

Later career and death 
He served as president of the Taylor Chair Company in Bedford until his death there December 2, 1922. Taylor was interred in Bedford Cemetery.

References
 Retrieved on 2008-11-03

1845 births
1922 deaths
People from Bedford, Ohio
Union Army soldiers
Republican Party Ohio state senators
American manufacturing businesspeople
Republican Party members of the United States House of Representatives from Ohio